Simeon ha-Pakoli (Hebrew: שמעון הפקולי) was a rabbi who lived in the late 1st century (second generation of tannaim). He was a contemporary of Rabban Gamaliel II at Jabneh.

He arranged the eighteen blessings of the Shemoneh Esreh prayer in the sequence in which they have been handed down.

The name "Pakoli" is said to have been derived from Simeon's occupation, which was that of a dealer in flax and wool. Nothing further is known concerning him.

References

 

Mishnah rabbis